The Newport and Wickford Railroad and Steamboat Company was a railroad in Rhode Island. It was first chartered in 1862 as the Wickford Branch Railroad, and intended to connect Wickford Junction station to downtown Wickford, Rhode Island, by rail, and Wickford to Newport, Rhode Island, by steamboat. The company changed its name to the Wickford Railroad in 1864, before adopting its final name in 1870. Construction was completed in 1871, when the railroad began hauling both passengers and freight with a single locomotive and two railroad cars. Steamboats were purchased to connect to Newport. The railroad operated under the control of the New York, Providence and Boston Railroad, but maintained its own corporate identity until a 1909 takeover by the New York, New Haven and Hartford Railroad. Passenger trains and the steamboat service were both ended in October 1925, and the final half a mile to Wickford Landing was abandoned in 1938. The rest of the line was abandoned by the New Haven in 1962.

History

Formation and construction 
The New York, Providence and Boston Railroad (known as the Stonington Line) was the first railroad to be built in southern Rhode Island, completed in 1837. The company planned to route their line directly through the coastal village of Wickford, but surveyors were chased out of town by local farmers armed with guns. By the 1860s, Wickford residents had come to regret rejecting the railroad, and therefore decided to form their own company to connect Wickford to the Stonington Line.

The railroad would also connect to Wickford's port, where steamboats could be run to Newport, Rhode Island, a popular summer destination for wealthy New York City residents. At the time, the connection between trains from New York City and steamboats was in Greenwich, Connecticut. Traveling by ship to Newport from west of Rhode Island meant traveling past Point Judith, an area known for rough seas. An all-rail trip meant traveling via Providence, Rhode Island, and Fall River, Massachusetts, which took a significant amount of time.

The railroad was first chartered in 1862 as the Wickford Branch Railroad, before amending its charter in 1864 and dropping the "branch" from its name. A survey for the line was completed in January 1864, identifying a two-and-a-half-mile (4.0 km) route from the Stonington Line's Wickford depot to Wickford proper.

A third charter was granted in 1870 and the company adopted its final name, the Newport and Wickford Railroad and Steamboat Company. Construction was completed in June 1871. The total cost of the railroad and equipment, including a steamboat, was just under $164,000.

Independent operations 

In addition to passenger service, the railroad also provided freight service to Wickford's sole mill and several others along its route, plus mail to and from Newport. Trains were initially hauled by a Forney locomotive originally designed for operating on elevated railroads, where turning facilities were unavailable. This was despite turntables being available at both ends of the line. The company's rolling stock included a grand total of two railroad cars.

While an independent company, the Newport and Wickford contracted out train operations to the Stonington Line. For the first few years, trains only ran during the summer, but in 1874 a steam dummy was purchased to enable operations in the quieter winter months.

Takeover by the New Haven and abandonment 
By the start of the 1900s, the Newport and Wickford was in financial trouble. It had new competition from the Sea View Railroad, a trolley line operating between Narragansett Pier and East Greenwich through Wickford. The Sea View's average fare was two cents per trip, compared to the Newport and Wickford's five cents. This attracted the ire of North Kingstown's town council, which sought to have the Newport and Wickford reduce its fares to match its competition. In October 1908, the New York, New Haven and Hartford Railroad reported that the Newport and Wickford owed it $40,000 in passenger and freight revenues and would no longer allow the latter company any credit. In response, the Newport and Wickford entered receivership.

The Newport and Wickford's financial issues continued, and the following year it was foreclosed on. After publicly stating it had no interest in the Newport and Wickford, at the last minute the New Haven reversed itself and bought the company at its foreclosure sale in November 1909, claiming it was doing so for the public good. In purchasing the Newport and Wickford, the New Haven struck a deal with the company's bondholders to pay them 60 percent of the value of the bonds; the stockholders of the Newport and Wickford had their shares almost totally wiped out.

The New Haven ended passenger service and the steamboat connection in October 1925, and the tracks to the dock at Wickford Landing were subsequently abandoned in 1938. The remainder of the line continued in freight service until 1962, when the New Haven abandoned all remaining tracks. While the tracks are long gone, the right-of-way of most of the line was still visible in 2012.

Station listing

Notes

References 
 
  First edition .

Defunct Rhode Island railroads
Railway companies established in 1870
Railway companies disestablished in 1909
1870 establishments in Rhode Island
1909 disestablishments in the United States